Jerry Jacobs may refer to:

 Jerry Jacobs Jr. (born 1962), American businessman
 Jerry A. Jacobs (born 1955), American sociologist
 Jerry Jacobs (American football) (born 1997), American football player